John Scudamore, 2nd Viscount Scudamore DL (c. 1650 – July 1697), was an English landowner and politician.

Scudamore was the son of James Scudamore (died 1668) by Jane Bennet, daughter of Richard Bennet. He was the grandson of John Scudamore, 1st Viscount Scudamore,  He succeeded his grandfather in the viscountcy in 1671. This was an Irish peerage and did not entitle him to a seat in the English House of Lords. He was instead returned to Parliament for Hereford in 1673, a seat he held until 1679, and then represented Herefordshire until 1681. He was also a Deputy Lieutenant of Gloucestershire and High Steward of Hereford.

Lord Scudamore married Lady Frances Cecil, only daughter of John Cecil, 4th Earl of Exeter, in 1672. They had three sons, of whom the eldest died young. Lady Scudamore died in 1694. Lord Scudamore survived her by three years and died in July 1697. He was succeeded in the viscountcy by his second but eldest surviving son, James.

References

1650 births
1697 deaths
Year of birth uncertain
Viscounts in the Peerage of Ireland
Deputy Lieutenants of Gloucestershire
English landowners
John
English MPs 1661–1679
English MPs 1679
English MPs 1680–1681
English MPs 1681